Lac de Conflans is a lake at the confluence of the rivers Ain and Valouse. It lies in the communes of Thoirette, in the Jura department, and Corveissiat in the Ain department of France.

Conflans
Conflans